Montreuil is a railway station in the commune of Versailles (department of Yvelines), in the Montreuil neighborhood. It is in the Île-de-France region of France and is part of the Transilien rail network, on the Paris-Saint-Lazare – Versailles-Rive-Droite line.

The station 
The station is served by line L trains of the Transilien Paris – Saint Lazare network.  There is a train every 15 minutes in each direction during the day, and every 30 minutes in the evening.  All trains to or from Versailles Rive Droite also serve the Montreuil station.

In 2014, a point of sale is open every day from 5:55 to 1:55. ATMs Transilien and TGV are also available. A Relay press shop is present, as well as distributors of beverages or confections, automatic photography booth and a telephone booth. In 2015, a service of removing automated packages, named Pick Up Station, was installed between the parking of the station and the passenger building. Lifts are also available on two platforms for persons with reduced mobility.
A bike park is located outside the station, and a free relay of 50 to 100 places Park is built for vehicles.

See also 
 Other train stations in Versailles:
 Versailles – Rive Gauche
 Versailles – Chantiers
 Versailles – Rive Droite
 Porchefontaine

External links
 

Railway stations in Yvelines
Transport in Versailles